Chavenay, also known as Vallon de Chavenay, is a commune in the Yvelines department in the Île-de-France region in north-central France. It is located close to Saint-Nom-la-Bretèche, Saint-Germain-en-Laye, and Versailles.

Twin towns
Along with Crespières, Feucherolles and Saint-Nom-la-Bretèche Chavenay is twinned with Rösrath, Germany.

See also
Communes of the Yvelines department

References

Communes of Yvelines